Risira Weerasuriya (born 28 August 2000) is a Sri Lankan cricketer. He made his first-class debut on 31 January 2020, for Sri Lanka Air Force Sports Club in Tier B of the 2019–20 Premier League Tournament. He made his Twenty20 debut on 10 March 2021, for Chilaw Marians Cricket Club in the 2020–21 SLC Twenty20 Tournament.

References

External links
 

2000 births
Living people
Sri Lankan cricketers
Chilaw Marians Cricket Club cricketers
Sri Lanka Air Force Sports Club cricketers
People from Matara, Sri Lanka